Cladocora caespitosa, commonly known as cushion coral, is a stony coral of the subclass Hexacorallia. This species forms the only true coral reef in the Mediterranean Sea.

Description 

The polyps are a clear maroon colour, around 5 mm in diameter and form cushion-shaped colonies, in symbiosis with Zooxanthella algae. They produce deposits of calcium carbonate which form the calciate structures in which they live. It is the largest stony coral in the Mediterranean, reaching up to 50 cm in diameter. C. caespitosa has an average generation length of about 30 years.

Distribution and habitat 
This species is endemic to the Mediterranean Sea, where it is attested already in the Upper Pliocene. It is common on rocky seabeds between a few metres and 60 metres in depth. In the marine lagoon of Veliko Jezero, in the marine reserve of Mljet island, Croatia, there is a small coral reef made up of C. caespitosa. It was believed to be the only true coral reef in the Mediterranean.
Recent findings in the Adriatic Sea show that Cladocora c. is not the only one reef building specie of the Mediterranean Sea.

Reproduction 
The colonies grow through budding, but the species spreads through the settlement of plankton-like larva on seabed suited to colonisation.

Threats
Cladocora caespitosa is classified as endangered under the IUCN red list, mostly based on recent mass die-offs caused by heat wave events in the Mediterranean.

References

Bibliography

External links
 

Scleractinia
Corals described in 1758
Taxa named by Carl Linnaeus